Sisi Zlatanova is a Bulgarian/Dutch researcher in geospatial data, geographic information systems, and 3D modeling. She works as a professor in the faculty of the Built Environment, at the University of New South Wales (UNSW), and is president of Technical Commission IV
(Spatial Information Science) of the International Society for Photogrammetry and Remote Sensing.

Education and career
Zlatanova studied surveying at the University of Architecture, Civil Engineering and Geodesy in Bulgaria.

At UNSW, she is the head of the Geospatial Research Innovation and Development lab (GRID). Her research there includes building 3D city models and Digital Twins of the university and urban areas.

References

External links
Home page

Year of birth missing (living people)
Living people
Graz University of Technology alumni
Academic staff of the Delft University of Technology
Academic staff of the University of New South Wales
Geographic information scientists
Australian women academics
Bulgarian women academics